La Ferté-Milon station (French: Gare de La Ferté-Milon) is a railway station serving La Ferté-Milon, Aisne department, in northern France. It is situated on the line from Paris-Est to Reims.

History 
Since 3 April 2016, the railway link between La Ferté-Milon and Fismes has been operated by a replacement bus services. SNCF justified their decision based on the high costs of renovating the line. In 2018, SNCF estimated that the station saw 97,098 Transilien passengers.

References

Railway stations in Aisne
Railway stations in France opened in 1885